EXW can stand for:
Elite Xtreme Wrestling, now known as Future Stars of Wrestling. One of the tag team champions was Val Venus.
Enlisted Expeditionary Warfare Specialist, a qualification badge of the U.S. Navy
Explosion welding, a solid state process where welding is accomplished by accelerating one of the components at extremely high velocity through the use of chemical explosives
Ex Works, Incoterm term where the seller makes the goods available at its premises